The 1914 All-Ireland Senior Hurling Championship was the 28th staging of the All-Ireland hurling championship since its establishment by the Gaelic Athletic Association in 1887. The championship began on 10 May 1914 and ended on 18 October 1914.

Kilkenny entered the championship as defending champions, however, they were beaten by Laois in the Leinster final. Clare won the title following a 5-1 to 1-0 defeat of Laois in the final.

Teams

Team summaries

Results

Connacht Senior Hurling Championship

Ulster Senior Hurling Championship

Leinster Senior Hurling Championship

Munster Senior Hurling Championship

All-Ireland Senior Hurling Championship

Championship statistics

Miscellaneous

 Monaghan win the Ulster title for the first time in their history. They then opt to play in the All-Ireland Junior Hurling Championship for the conclusion of the 1914 season.
 Laois win the Leinster title for the first time in their history.
 The All-Ireland final is the first ever championship meeting of Clare and Laois. Clare win the All-Ireland title for the first time in their history.

Sources

 Corry, Eoghan, The GAA Book of Lists (Hodder Headline Ireland, 2005).
 Donegan, Des, The Complete Handbook of Gaelic Games (DBA Publications Limited, 2005).

References

1914
All-Ireland Senior Hurling Championship